Fraport Arena is an indoor arena that is located in Frankfurt, Germany.  It is primarily used to host basketball games, volleyball matches, and indoor football matches. The arena's seating capacity is 5,002 people for basketball games.

History
The arena, which was originally named Ballsporthalle Frankfurt, opened in 1988. It has been the home arena of the German professional basketball club the Fraport Skyliners since 1999. The arena was renamed Fraport Arena, after Frankfurt International Airport obtained its sponsorship naming rights in 2011.

The arena hosts the local annual indoor football tournament, with six teams from the region, such as Eintracht Frankfurt and Kickers Offenbach. The arena hosted the German Davis Cup Team in 2014, 2015, and 2017. It also hosted the German men's national volleyball team, in the FIVB Volleyball World League.

References

External links
 Arena information 

Basketball venues in Germany
Buildings and structures in Frankfurt
Indoor arenas in Germany
Sports venues in Frankfurt
Volleyball venues in Germany